Voerendaal is a municipality and a town in the southeastern Netherlands.

Population centres 

Dutch topographic map of the municipality of Voerendaal, June 2015

History
The Romans left the ruins from a Roman villa rustica as a legacy. In 1049 pope Leo IX initiated the Catholic Church - Sint Laurentiuskerk. During medieval times many castles were built: Cortenbach, Haeren, Puth, Rivieren and Terworm. Also castles such as Hoenshuis and Overst Voerendaal. The area was mined for marl (mergel in Dutch) and coal.

Transportation
Railway Station:Klimmen-Ransdaal, Voerendaal

Notable people 
 Roel Brouwers (born 1981) a Dutch former footballer with 289 club caps, lived in Voerendaal while playing for Borussia Monchengladbach

Gallery

References

External links

Official website

 
Populated places in Limburg (Netherlands)
Municipalities of Limburg (Netherlands)
South Limburg (Netherlands)